Imthihaan is a 1993 Maldivian family drama film developed and directed by M.M. Hussain. The film stars Reeko Moosa Manik, Mariyam Manike, Ali Shakir, Ahmed Khalid and Suneetha in main roles.

Premise
Saeedha (Mariyam Manike) an ambitious and old-fashioned lady, works as a teacher where her married life is viewed as an example from the outside. Saeedha's husband, Saleem (Ali Shakir) was offered a job as a headmaster from an island far away from the capital. His decision to accept the offer arises complications in their married life. After his departure, Saleem started drifting apart from his family insisting to spend some alone time. Meanwhile, Saeedha's daughter, Shaama (Suneetha), started having an affair with a womanizer, Mohamed Aslam (Ahmed Giyas) and slowly becomes de-attached from the studies and her family responsibilities while coming home late.

Upon learning Shaama and Aslam's affair, Saeedha despises their relationship to which Shaama reacts to quit her studies and marry Aslam instead. As life keeps testing her patience, Saleem informs her about his firm decision to divorce her and marry another woman. Shaama and Aslam finally gets married and she becomes pregnant to their first child. Saeedha determines to accept the offer made by the young and modern school inspector, Jamaal (Reeko Moosa Manik) to lead the school based in a north atoll. She decides to relocate to that island to which Shaama has a different opinion. After the birth of their child, the couple faces several obstacles as Shaama lacks the assistance and help from her husband.

Cast 
 Reeko Moosa Manik as Jamaal
 Mariyam Manike as Saeedha; school teacher
 Ali Shakir as Saleem; Saeedha's husband
 Ahmed Khalid as Ashraf; Saeedha's brother
 Suneetha as Shaama; Saeedha and Saleem's daughter
 Ahmed Giyas as Mohamed Aslam
 Waleedha Waleed as Ameena
 Koyya Hassan Manik as Haidhar; secondary Mathematics teacher
 Leenaz as Shiyama; Ashraf's first wife
 Mohamed Waheed as school headmaster
 Shinaz Mohamed as Maseeh; Saeedha and Saleem's son
 Mariyam Haajara as Haajara
 Ibrahim Shakir
 Chilhiya Moosa Manik as a doctor

Soundtrack

Reception
Upon release, the film received mainly positive reviews from critics for its emotional elements and the performance of the cast for justifying the scope of each character.

References

Maldivian drama films
1993 films
1993 drama films
Dhivehi-language films